Claudio Trionfi is an Italian film and television actor.

Selected filmography
 China Is Near (1967)
 The Protagonists (1968)
 Death Sentence (1968)
 Bridge Over the Elbe (1969)
 Normal Young Man (1969)
 Double Face (1969)
 More Dollars for the MacGregors (1970)
 Black Killer (1971)
 They Have Changed Their Face (1971)
 Morel's Invention (1974)

References

Bibliography
 Pitts, Michael R. Western Movies: A Guide to 5,105 Feature Films. McFarland, 2012.

External links

 Claudio Trionfi (Italian Version)

1942 births
Living people
Italian male television actors
Italian male film actors
Male actors from Rome